John Inglis (born 16 October 1966) is a Scottish former professional footballer. He was nicknamed "Zeus".

John began his career as a professional footballer in 1983. He played the majority of his career with Scottish Premier League clubs St Johnstone FC and Aberdeen FC. John won the Scottish League Cup in 1995. He moved to Levski Sofia, becoming the first Scot to play in the A PFG, and then winning the League and Cup double in 1999-2000.

Following his retirement, Inglis remained in Bulgaria and became an agent. John took his football agents license in Bulgaria and holds an agents license 0032 with the Bulgarian BFU. He is married to a Bulgarian former model and has twin daughters Anabelle and Angelica.

Honours
Aberdeen 
 Scottish League Cup: 1995–96

Levski Sofia
 Bulgarian League: 1999–2000
 Bulgarian Cup: 1999–2000

References

External links

 Profile at LevskiSofia.info

1966 births
Living people
Footballers from Edinburgh
Scottish footballers
East Fife F.C. players
Brechin City F.C. players
Livingston F.C. players
St Johnstone F.C. players
Aberdeen F.C. players
PFC Levski Sofia players
Carlisle United F.C. players
Raith Rovers F.C. players
Scottish Premier League players
Scottish Football League players
English Football League players
First Professional Football League (Bulgaria) players
Scottish expatriate footballers
Expatriate footballers in Bulgaria
Scottish expatriate sportspeople in Bulgaria
Association football central defenders
Association football agents